LC3 (Low Complexity Communication Codec) is an audio codec specified by the Bluetooth Special Interest Group (SIG) for the LE Audio audio protocol introduced in Bluetooth 5.2. It's developed by Fraunhofer IIS and Ericsson as the successor of the SBC codec.

LC3 provides higher audio quality and better Packet loss concealment than SBC, G.722 and Opus, according to subjective testing by the Bluetooth Special Interest Group and ETSI. The conclusion regarding Opus is disputed as the test only included speech audio, but the comparison was made to version 1.1.4 of the reference Opus encoder, using complexity level 0 at 32kbps and relying on CELT (general audio) instead of SILK (speech); the test also did not take into account the newer version 1.2 of the Opus encoder released in 2017, where significant improvements were made to low bitrate streams.

Supported systems:

 Android 13
 Zephyr OS

LC3plus
LC3plus High Resolution mode is a codec defined by ETSI and is not compatible with the LC3 defined by Bluetooth SIG. It's included in the 2019 DECT standard.

On November 9th 2022, the Japan Audio Society (JAS) released a statement certifying LC3plus with the "Hi-Res AUDIO WIRELESS" logo. LC3plus is the 4th codec to receive this, alongside MQair, LDAC and LHDC codecs.

See also 

 List of codecs
 SBC (codec)
 AptX
 LDAC (codec)
 LHDC (codec)
 Lossy compression

References

Audio codecs
Bluetooth